Dekanosidze is a Georgian surname. Notable people with the surname include:

Lasha Dekanosidze (born 1987), Georgian football player
Giorgi Dekanosidze (born 1981), Georgian football player

Georgian-language surnames